The leader of the Scottish National Party is the head of the SNP. The incumbent is Nicola Sturgeon who was elected unopposed in November 2014, succeeding Alex Salmond as party leader and First Minister of Scotland.

History
The post was officially created on 7 April 1934 with the foundation of the SNP. The role was titled Chairman of the Scottish National Party from 1934 until 1969, with the first chairman, Alexander MacEwen, appointed to the office in 1934. In 1969 the title of chairman was replaced with that of National Convener, with William Wolfe the first person elected as National Convener. The post gained its current title of Leader at the SNP spring conference on 24 April 2004.

Role
Currently, the leader Nicola Sturgeon, the first minister and leader of the Scottish National Party, is responsible for the overall growth. They usually advocate for Scottish independence and pro-Europeanism.

Keith Brown is the deputy leader of the Scottish National Party; however, he is not the deputy first minister of Scotland.

Stephen Flynn is the Leader of the Scottish National Party in Westminster, along with Mhairi Black, who is deputy leader.

Leaders of the Scottish National Party (1934–present)

References 

 
Scottish National Party